Guido Maria Kretschmer (born 11 May 1965) is a German fashion designer and television personality.

Life and career 
Guido Maria Kretschmer was born in Münster on 11 May 1965 and grew up in Einen, Warendorf. After two semesters of studying medicine, he began his career as a designer in Ibiza on the popular hippie market of the island with a small stand of clothes that he had sewn himself. This earned him the attention of German musician Udo Lindenberg, who ordered brocade jackets for his tour. In 1987, Kretschmer founded the company GMK by pepper, with its headquarters in Münster and Palma, as well as the fashion label Guido Maria Kretschmer Corporate Fashion. Initially with three employees, he mostly worked as designer for large companies. His first large-scale order was the creation of uniforms for crew members of the airline Hapag-Lloyd Flug. Along with work outfits for Deutsche Telekom, Kempinski, and Emirates Airlines, he also designed around 2,5 million suits for the TUI Group.

In 2004, Kretschmer founded the label Guido Maria Couture, with which he reached his creative focal point, designing cocktail dresses and evening gowns as well as the associated accessories. His first fashion shows in this field were held in Shanghai and Tokyo. In 2005, he presented his creations for the first time at the Berlin Fashion Week. After he was chosen by German actress Katharina Thalbach to design the stage outfits for an Oscar Wilde play, he began designing for various theatre and film productions, such as for a production of The Barber of Seville by the Deutsche Oper Berlin. In the latter two, he also had guest roles. His label is regularly represented on large fashion shows and celebrities such as Charlize Theron, Jane Seymour, Patricia Kaas, Iris Berben, Martina Gedeck, Jasmin Wagner, and Heino Ferch have worn his creations. He maintains showrooms in Münster, Berlin, and Palma, and opened a shop in Munich in 2009.

Since January 2012, Kretschmer has been presenting the television show Shopping Queen on VOX as well as its celebrity version since April of the same year. In March 2012, he entered a civil union with his longtime partner Frank Mutters at the Rathaus Schöneberg; they would later be married in 2018. A special collection named "Guido Maria Kretschmer for eBay" was developed up until 23 April 2013 as part of a crowdsourcing project in which visitors of the project page could vote on the collection and its production. Also in 2013, he published his first book, Anziehungskraft: Stil kennt keine Größe. In 2013 and 2014, Kretschmer was a judge on Das Supertalent, the German instalment of the Got Talent franchise, alongside Dieter Bohlen, Bruce Darnell, and Lena Gercke. Since the autumn of 2014, he has been advertising for the OGI Oil & Gas Invest AG. In May 2018, he was part of the presenter team for RTL's broadcast of the wedding of Prince Harry and Meghan Markle, alongside Frauke Ludowig. RTL's reporting as well as that of concurrent channel ZDF were criticised for being "disrespectful" and "racist".

Filmography

Film 
 2007 – Messy Christmas
 2010 – 
 2011 – 
 2018 –

Television 
 2012 –  (juror)
 Since 2012 –  (commentator and juror)
 Since 2012 –  (commentator and juror)
 2013 and 2014 – Das Supertalent (juror)
 2014 – Hotter Than My Daughter (presenter)
 2015 – Deutschlands schönste Frau (presenter)
 2015 and 2016 – Geschickt eingefädelt – Wer näht am besten? (presenter)
 2019:  (guest, season 9 episode 1)
 2019: Guidos Masterclass (juror and moderator)
 2020:  (juror)
 2021: Guidos Deko Queen (commentator and juror)

Bibliography

By Guido Maria Kretschmer 
 Anziehungskraft: Stil kennt keine Größe. Edel, Hamburg 2014, .
 Eine Bluse macht noch keinen Sommer: Geschichten aus dem Kleiderschrank. Edel, Hamburg 2014, .

About Guido Maria Kretschmer 
 Wellinghaus, Max – Guido (biography with coloured pictures) mvg, Munich 2015,

Awards 
 2002 – Winner of the World of TUI Design Award for the design concept Sand, Sea and Sky
 2008 – Nachwuchsdesigner des Jahres on the occasion of the New Faces Award by magazine Bunte
 2009 – Winner of the IF Design Award in Munich
 2009 – Winner of the Telekom Corporate Fashion Design Award
 2014 – Goldene Kamera for Beste Unterhaltung
 2014 – Romy for Beste Unterhaltung
 2014 – Deutscher Fernsehpreis for Bestes Dokutainment (for Shopping Queen)
 2014 –  for his work as a presenter
 2015 – Romy in the category Unterhaltung/Talk/Doku-Soap
 2015 – 
 2016 –  in the category Medienmann des Jahres

References 

1965 births
German LGBT entertainers
German LGBT broadcasters
LGBT fashion designers
German fashion designers
German gay artists
German television presenters
German television personalities
Living people